Clear Creek is a census-designated place (CDP) in Lassen County, California. Its population is 175 as of the 2020 census, up from 169 from the 2010 census.

Geography
According to the United States Census Bureau, the CDP has a total area of 1.1 square miles (2.9 km), of which, over 99% of it is land.

Demographics
At the 2010 census Clear Creek had a population of 169. The racial makeup of Clear Creek was 149 (88.2%) White, 0 (0.0%) African American, 5 (3.0%) Native American, 0 (0.0%) Asian, 2 (1.2%) Pacific Islander, 1 (0.6%) from other races, and 12 (7.1%) from two or more races. Hispanic or Latino of any race were 15 people (8.9%).

The whole population lived in households, no one lived in non-institutionalized group quarters and no one was institutionalized.

There were 73 households, 17 (23.3%) had children under the age of 18 living in them, 35 (47.9%) were opposite-sex married couples living together, 7 (9.6%) had a female householder with no husband present, 6 (8.2%) had a male householder with no wife present.  There were 5 (6.8%) unmarried opposite-sex partnerships, and 0 (0%) same-sex married couples or partnerships. 18 households (24.7%) were one person and 4 (5.5%) had someone living alone who was 65 or older. The average household size was 2.32.  There were 48 families (65.8% of households); the average family size was 2.69.

The age distribution was 29 people (17.2%) under the age of 18, 9 people (5.3%) aged 18 to 24, 26 people (15.4%) aged 25 to 44, 71 people (42.0%) aged 45 to 64, and 34 people (20.1%) who were 65 or older.  The median age was 49.7 years. For every 100 females, there were 101.2 males.  For every 100 females age 18 and over, there were 118.8 males.

There were 162 housing units at an average density of 142.3 per square mile, of the occupied units 55 (75.3%) were owner-occupied and 18 (24.7%) were rented. The homeowner vacancy rate was 5.2%; the rental vacancy rate was 14.3%.  124 people (73.4% of the population) lived in owner-occupied housing units and 45 people (26.6%) lived in rental housing units.

Politics

References

Census-designated places in Lassen County, California
Census-designated places in California